Gheorghe Coriolan Ciuhandu (born 15 June 1947) is a Romanian politician.

A building engineer by profession, he graduated from the Traian Vuia Polytechnic Institute in 1970, earning a doctorate in 1986 and joining the faculty in 1993. He was the mayor of Timișoara from 1996 to 2012 and was one of the losing candidates for president in the 2004 presidential elections, in which he represented the Christian Democratic National Peasants' Party (PNȚCD). He replaced Victor Ciorbea as president of the PNȚCD in 2004, and, in 2007 he was replaced by Marian Petre Miluț as president of PNȚCD.

Honours 

  Romanian Royal Family: 42nd Knight of the Royal Decoration of the Cross of the Romanian Royal House

Electoral history

Presidential elections

Notes

External links 

 Official site
 Ciuhandu's political opinions

1947 births
Living people
Politehnica University of Timișoara alumni
Academic staff of the Politehnica University of Timișoara
Romanian engineers
Mayors of Timișoara
Christian Democratic National Peasants' Party politicians
Candidates for President of Romania